The White Earth is a 2004 novel by Australian author Andrew McGahan. The book won the 2005 Miles Franklin Award.

The stage version, adapted by McGahan and Shaun Charles, premiered at Brisbane's La Boite Theatre in February–March 2009.

Plot
The book follows a dual narrative between the perspectives of William and John, where William's takes place over the time period of late 1992 to 1993 and John's takes place from his childhood up to the present of 1993.

William's narrative follows his father dying in an explosion and William and his mother being invited by John to Kuran Station. At the station, William learns from John some stories of the land and is introduced to the water hole. John then organises an anti-Native Title rally, which ends in disaster as it gets out of control. At the rally, William sees a burning man in nausea and John is injured in the chaos. After the rally, John's daughter, Ruth, arrives in awareness of John's injury, and the daughter and father are shown to have a bad relationship. After an argument between John and Ruth, William experiences a moment of realisation and leaves for the water hole. At the water hole, he finds it to be empty, despite it being described as always flowing. After William is driven back to Kuran House by Ruth, he realises that there were bones inside the empty water hole. John drives William to retrieve the bones and proceeds to burn them, resulting in the entire house catching fire.

Notes
Dedication: For my parents, whose life this isn't.
 
Author's note: This is a work of fiction. While the Darling Downs are real enough, the northern parts of the region do not exist as described here. This story is not meant to portray any actual place, person or event.

Awards
Festival Awards for Literature (SA), Dymocks Booksellers Award for Fiction, 2006: shortlisted
International Dublin Literary Award, 2006: longlisted
Commonwealth Writers Prize, South East Asia and South Pacific Region, Best Book, 2005: winner
Miles Franklin Literary Award, 2005: winner
The Age Book of the Year Award, Fiction Prize, 2004: winner
Queensland Premier's Literary Awards, Best Fiction Book, 2004: shortlisted
The Courier-Mail Book of the Year Award, 2004: winner

Reviews
"The Age"
"The Sydney Morning Herald"

Stage version 

La Boite Theatre Company, Brisbane, Australia.

23 February – 21 March 2009

Adapted and Directed by Shaun Charles and Andrew McGahan
Designer Greg Clarke
Lighting Designer David Walters
Sound Designer/Composer Guy Webster
Cinematic Design Markwell Presents
Cast Stace Callaghan, Dan Eady, Penny Everingham, Kathryn Marquet, Veronica Neave, Anthony Phelan & Steven Tandy

External links
 La Boite's website with Production Information
 La Boite brings Andrew McGahan's White Earth to life
 Warped Soul in a Harsh Land - Interview with leading actor
 Gothic Drama Makes for an Epic Feast - Review of Stage Production.
 La Boite's White Earth Stretches to Mythic Proportions - Review of Stage Production.
 Australian Stage - Review of stage production
 http://www.colorado.edu/geography/class_homepages/geog_1982_f06/NativeTitle-TheWhiteEarth.pdf

2004 Australian novels
Miles Franklin Award-winning works
Novels set in Queensland
Darling Downs